= Who Wants to Be Me? =

2000 book by Regis Philbin

Who Wants To Be Me?
- Author: Regis Philbin
- Language: English
- Publisher: Hyperion
- Publication date: 2000
- Publication place: United States
- Pages: 224
- ISBN: 0786867396

Who Wants To Be Me? is a 2000 book by Regis Philbin. It is a response to the success of the game show Who Wants to Be a Millionaire? and deals with more antics about the show and Philbin's life.
